The Swan is an American reality television series broadcast by the Fox Broadcasting Company (Fox). It premiered on April 7, 2004, while its eighteenth and final episode aired on December 20, 2004. The series was hosted by Irish television presenter Amanda Byram.

Each episode of the series followed two self-proclaimed "ugly ducklings" who, over the course of a three-month period, experienced an extreme makeover from a team that included a personal trainer, therapist, dentist, and cosmetic surgeons. Whichever woman was deemed more attractive at the end of the three months would move forward to compete in a beauty pageant held at the end of the season.  Following the pageant, whichever contestant received the most votes for the greatest transformation would be given the title "The Swan".

The Swan was universally panned by critics and audiences alike. Criticism of the series often focused on the promotion of a negative body image for women. Despite the negative reception, The Swan premiered to high ratings and averaged around 9 million viewers over the course of its first season. Since its airing, several of the contestants have voiced either satisfaction or regret over their participation in the series. Additionally, several producers have defended The Swan, in which they claimed its purpose was to increase the self-esteem of its contestants. In 2013, Fox announced plans to revive the series as a two-hour television special titled Celebrity Swan.

Production
In 2005, Rebecca Hertz, a writer of the series, admitted that the series' staff manufactured dialogue and situations throughout the editing process. Hertz claimed that she falsely made it appear as though contestant Rachel Love-Fraser's husband was unhappily married to her, stating, "In a pre-interview, I led her husband to say Rachel looks average, but he thought she looked beautiful. I cut it down to him saying she looks average, so he sounded like a mean, horrible a–hole. He was furious when he saw the show".

Series overview

Season 1 (2004)
The Swan debuted on April 7, 2004.

 Through to the pageant
 Wildcard
 Contestant Tanya dropped out of the show (on her own accord) after being caught with a mirror (which is against the rules of appearing on the series), so Merline was automatically in the swan pageant.

Swan pageant
At the show the judges would score in every category with the swan contestants competing, eventually being whittled down to three finalists. The judges at the show were:

 Susie Castillo – Miss USA 2003
 Valerie Trott – model management executive
 Judith Regan – publisher of several self-help books
 Tara Kraft – beauty director of Star magazine
 Mike Ruiz – Fashion photographer

The winner received a modeling contract, and various premiums by corporate sponsors.

Final competition scores

 Winner
 First runner-up
 Second runner-up 
 Top 6
 Top 9
(#)  Rank in each round of competition

After 9 episodes and 16 makeovers it was announced that Rachel Love-Fraser had won the swan pageant. Beth placed runner-up, with Cindy second runner-up.

Season 2 (2004)
Season two debuted on October 27, 2004. Kari and Gina B. from episode 4 were sisters.

 Through to the pageant
 Wildcard

Swan pageant
At the show the judges scored the swan contestants in several categories, whittling them down to three finalists. The judges at the show were:

 Ken Baker – West Coast Executive Editor of US Weekly magazine
 Krista Sides-Klayman – LA Models Management, 
 Carnie Wilson – Wilson Phillips singer, actor, author
 Larry A. Thompson – Producer, Author
 Dayanara Torres – Miss Universe 1993

The winner was awarded a contract as a spokesperson, and various premiums by corporate sponsors.

Final competition scores

 Winner
 First runner-up
 Second runner-up
 Top 5
 Top 9
(#)  Rank in each round of competition

After 9 episodes and 16 makeovers it was announced that DeLisa Styles had won the swan pageant. Gina B. placed runner-up, with Erica second runner-up.

Reception

Robert Bianco of USA Today called The Swan "hurtful and repellent even by reality's constantly plummeting standards". Journalist Jennifer Pozner, in her book Reality Bites Back, calls The Swan "the most sadistic reality series of the decade". Journalist Chris Hedges also criticized the show in his 2009 book Empire of Illusion, writing "The Swan'''s transparent message is that once these women have been surgically 'corrected' to resemble mainstream celebrity beauty as closely as possible, their problems will be solved". Feminist scholar Susan J. Douglas criticized the show in her book The Rise of Enlightened Sexism for its continuation of a negative female body image, claiming that "it made all too explicit the narrow physical standards to which women are expected to conform, the sad degree to which women internalize these standards, the lengths needed to get there, and the impossibility for most of us to meet the bar without, well, taking a box cutter to our faces and bodies".

Author Alice Marwick believes that this program is an example of "body culture media", which she describes as "a genre of popular culture which positions work on the body as a morally correct solution to personal problems". Marwick also suggests that cosmetic reality television encourages viewers to frame their family, financial, or social problems in bodily terms, and portrays surgical procedures as an everyday and normal solution. The Swan draws from cultural discourses of plastic surgery and self-improvement culture to frame cosmetic surgery as "a morally appropriate means to achieving an authentic self". The Swan portrays cosmetic surgery as an empowered, feminist practice. However the tension between the
empowerment, and feminism of cosmetic surgery, and a confining, compulsory
model of what that subject should look like reveals the limitations of the
‘‘you go, girl’’ notion of consumer choice.The Swan attracted further criticism internationally as British comedian and writer Charlie Brooker launched attacks on it during his Channel 4 show You Have Been Watching, where guest Josie Long suggested the show be renamed "The bullies were right".

In 2013, second-season contestant Lorrie Arias spoke publicly about problems she attributed to her participation in The Swan, including unresolved surgery complications and mental health problems she says were exacerbated by her appearance on the program.

In 2010, Entertainment Weekly'' ranked the program the worst reality television show ever produced.

See also
 List of television shows notable for negative reception

References

External links
 Official Website (via Internet Archive)
 

2004 American television series debuts
2004 American television series endings
2000s American reality television series
2004 controversies in the United States
Makeover reality television series
Fashion-themed reality television series
Fox Broadcasting Company original programming
Television controversies in the United States
Television series by Fremantle (company)
Television shows set in Los Angeles
Television series about plastic surgery